Kamian-e Bala (also Romanized as Kāmīān-e Bālā and Kāmyān-e Bālā; also known as Kāmīān, Kāmīyān, and Kāmyān) is a village in Japelaq-e Gharbi Rural District, Japelaq District, Azna County, Lorestan Province, Iran. At the 2006 census, its population was 79, in 16 families.

References 

Towns and villages in Azna County